BandQuest is a series of band music for middle-level band commissioned and published by the American Composers Forum, a national non-profit composer service organization based in Saint Paul, Minnesota.  The series is exclusively distributed by Hal Leonard Corporation based in Milwaukee, Wisconsin.

Purpose
The idea for BandQuest began in 2000 after a national survey of music educators conducted by the American Composers Forum revealed a need for fresh music for young bands.  Many young performers lack the technical ability to play pieces by more established composers.  To fill this need, American Composers Forum initially commissioned ten composers to write new works, and created accompanying CD-ROM curricula to support five of those ten works.  The CD-ROMs provide an interdisciplinary approach to learning music and teaches students (and their teachers) about the great composers who are living today.

Current efforts on the BandQuest series involve identifying additional support for additional commissions and enhancing the website to provide more curriculum, tools for teachers, and games for students.

BandQuest History
BandQuest formally began in March 2002, developed by the American Composers Forum through a two-year research process, in consultation with dozens of artists and educators.  Since that time the Forum has established National and Regional Advisory Committees for the project, contracted 14 composers for commissions, and retained key personnel for the positions of Music Editor and Curriculum Editor, as well as additional curriculum writers.

New Band Horizons vs. New Horizons Band
BandQuest originally began as New Band Horizons, but this title was too close to the national band group for senior performers titled New Horizons Band.  Shortly before publication the title of the series was changed to BandQuest.  Note that the historical documents in this entry refer to the program as New Band Horizons instead of its current name.

BandQuest Advanced
BandQuest Advanced launched in fall 2006 as a way to showcase the pieces in the series for more experienced bands.  The pieces included in the subseries of BandQuest Advanced include Gunther Schuller's "Nature's Way," Robert Xavier Rodriguez' "Smash the Windows," and Judith Lang Zaimont's "City Rain."

Available compositions
Libby Larsen's "Hambone," 
Thomas C. Duffy's "A+: A 'Precise' Prelude and an 'Excellent' March," 
Chen Yi's "Spring Festival"
Brent Michael Davids' "Grandmother Song,"
Alvin Singleton's "Ridgeview Centrum,"
Adolphus Hailstork's "New Wade 'n Water,"
Tania Leon's "Alegre,"
Judith Lang Zaimont's "City Rain,"
Robert Xavier Rodriguez' "Smash the Windows,"
Michael Colgrass's "Old Churches,"
Michael Daugherty's "Alligator Alley,"
Jennifer Higdon's "Rhythm Stand,"
Stephen Paulus' "Mosaic,"
Gunther Schuller's "Nature's Way."

External links
www.bandquest.org

Music education organizations
Non-profit organizations based in Minnesota